Crusius is a Latinized German surname, typically Latinized from Kraus or Krause. It may refer to:

 Christian August Crusius (1715–1775), German philosopher and Protestant theologian
 Ludwig Friedrich Otto Baumgarten-Crusius (1788–1843), German Protestant divine
 Otto Crusius (1857–1918), German classical scholar
 Patrick Wood Crusius, suspect in the 2019 El Paso shooting
 Yeda Crusius (born 1944), Brazilian politician

References

de:Crusius
fr:Crusius
sv:Crusius